Bandid Jaiyen is a former badminton player who won numerous Thai national titles and also excelled internationally between the late 1960s and the early 1980s.

Career
Thailand's leading singles player for a decade, the diminutive Jaiyen performed exceptionally well in Thomas Cup (men's international team) competition. He played a leading role in Thailand's upset win over Malaysia in Asian zone final of the 1973 Thomas Cup series. Noted for his exquisite strokes and tactical astuteness, he was the only player to win a match against an Indonesian opponent in the 1976 Thomas Cup series, and was one of only two to do so in the 1973 series. Among other international tournaments, Jaiyen won the South East Asian Peninsular singles title in 1975, the Canadian Open singles title in 1976, and the Auckland International singles title in 1977.

Achievements

Asian Games 
Mixed doubles

Asian Championships 
Men's singles

Southeast Asian Peninsular Games 
Men's singles

Men's doubles

International tournaments 
Men's singles

Men's doubles

Mixed doubles

References

Bandid Jaiyen
Living people
Asian Games medalists in badminton
Badminton players at the 1972 Summer Olympics
Badminton players at the 1970 Asian Games
Badminton players at the 1974 Asian Games
Badminton players at the 1978 Asian Games
Bandid Jaiyen
Bandid Jaiyen
Medalists at the 1970 Asian Games
Medalists at the 1978 Asian Games
Bandid Jaiyen
Southeast Asian Games medalists in badminton
Competitors at the 1973 Southeast Asian Peninsular Games
1950 births